Litorânea Aero Táxi, or simply Litorânea was a regional airline based in São Luis, Brazil.

Fleet 

Let 410 PR-VLA

Routes 

Fortaleza (Pinto Martins International Airport) - Camocim - Parnaíba - Barreirinhas - São Luís
São Luís - Teresina - Parnaíba - Fortaleza (Pinto Martins International Airport)

See also
List of defunct airlines of Brazil

External links 
Litorânea Aero Táxi

Defunct airlines of Brazil